Trident is a space mission concept to the outer planets proposed in 2019 to NASA's Discovery Program. The concept includes flybys of Jupiter and Neptune with a focus on Neptune's largest moon Triton.

In 2020, Trident was selected along with three other Discovery proposals for further study, with two expected to be selected to fly as Discovery 15 and 16. On 2 June 2021, NASA selected DAVINCI+ and VERITAS over Trident and the Io Volcano Observer.

History 
Triton is the largest moon of Neptune. Triton is geologically active, its surface is young and has relatively few impact craters. It has a very thin atmosphere. Voyager 2 was only able to observe approximately 40% of Triton's surface.

The Trident concept was proposed in March 2019 to NASA's Discovery Program. The mission concept is supported by NASA's Ocean Worlds Exploration Program and it is intended to help answer some of the questions generated by Voyager 2's flyby in 1989.

Overview 
Trident takes advantage of an efficient gravity assist alignment of Jupiter and Neptune (that occurs once every 13 years) to capitalize on a narrow observational window that enables assessment of changes in Triton's plume activity and surface characteristics since the previous encounter of Neptune-Triton by Voyager 2 in 1989. 

With the advances of high-resolution imaging and a unique orbital configuration of Triton in 2038, Trident would be able to obtain a near-complete map of the Neptune's moon during its sole flyby. Trident would pass through Triton's thin atmosphere, within  of the surface, sampling its ionosphere with a plasma spectrometer and perform magnetic induction measurements to assess the potential existence of an internal ocean. The principal investigator is Louise Prockter, director of the Lunar and Planetary Institute in Houston, Texas.

The launch vehicle proposed for Trident is the Atlas V 401, if it is not replaced with the Vulcan.

The proposed launch date in October 2025 (with a backup in October 2026) would take advantage of a once-in-13-years window, when Earth is properly aligned with Jupiter. The spacecraft would use the gravitational pull of Jupiter as a slingshot straight to Triton for an extended 13-day encounter in 2038.

Payload

Objects that Trident would visit

See also 
 Argo, a 2009 Triton flyby mission concept
 Interstellar Express, a Chinese probe proposed to fly by Neptune and Triton in January 2038 en route to the tail of the heliosphere
 New Horizons probe, performed a Pluto flyby in 2015
 New Horizons 2, a mission proposed in 2002 which might have included a Triton flyby
 Triton Hopper, a lander concept to Triton

References 

Discovery program proposals
Proposed NASA space probes
Missions to Neptune
Triton (moon)
Missions to Jupiter